Rabud (also spelled Khirbet Rabud) is a Palestinian village in the southern West Bank, in the Hebron Governorate of the State of Palestine. The village was the site of an ancient Canaanite city.

Etymology

According to Palmer, the name Khirbet Rabud means "the ruin of the animal's lair".

Demographics

Part of the Hebron Governorate of Palestine, it is located 13 kilometers southwest of Hebron and about 5 km northwest of as-Samu. Rabud had a population of 2,262 in the 2007 census by the Palestinian Central Bureau of Statistics (PCBS). The principal families are the Huraibat, Quteinah, al-Uqela and Shanan.

History
According to research by the Applied Research Institute-Jerusalem, Rabud's history dates back to the Canaanite period in Palestine, but the modern inhabitants of the village migrated from the Arabian Peninsula.

It is thought to lie on the site of the ancient Judean Kohanic city of Kiryat Sefer or Debir.(Trevor Bryce (2009). The Routledge Handbook of the Peoples and Places of Ancient Western Asia: From the Early Bronze Age to the Fall of the Persian Empire. Taylor & Francis. p. 588. ISBN 978-0-415-39485-7.)

Ceramics from the Byzantine era have been found here.

Ottoman period
In 1863, Victor Guérin found here "caves and cisterns dug into the rock, ...small demolished houses and, on the highest point, the remains of a roughly built tower". North and south-east of this place were two pierced walls, with many caves. Guérin named them Heurkan Beni Hasan.

In 1883, the PEF's Survey of Western Palestine found here "walls, cisterns, and rude cave tombs."

British Mandate period
The 1931 census of Palestine wrote that "the village in the Hebron sub-district commonly known as Dura is a congeries of neighbouring localities each of which has a distinctive name; and, while Dura is a remarkable example of neighbourly agglutination, the phenomenon is not infrequent in other villages". The total of 70 locations, among them Kh. Rabud, listed in the report had 1538 occupied houses and a population of 7255 Muslims.

Jordanian period
In the wake of the 1948 Arab–Israeli War, and after the 1949 Armistice Agreements, Rabud came under Jordanian rule.

In 1961, the population of Rabud was 206.

Post-1967
After the Six-Day War in 1967, Rabud has been under Israeli occupation. 

A village council was established by the Palestinian National Authority in 1993 to administer Rabud's civil affairs and provide limited municipal services. There is currently one mosque, Salah ad-Din Mosque, which serves the village.

References

Bibliography

External links
Welcome to Khirbat Rabud
Rabud, Welcome to Palestine
Survey of Western Palestine, Map 21:  IAA, Wikimedia commons
Rabud village (fact sheet), Applied Research Institute–Jerusalem (ARIJ)
Rabud village profile, ARIJ
Rabud aerial photo, ARIJ
The priorities and needs for development in Rabud village based on the community and local authorities’ assessment, ARIJ
Rabud, google-map

Villages in the West Bank
13 Kohanic cities
Municipalities of the State of Palestine

he:דביר (עיר עתיקה)